José Luis Oltra Castañer (born 24 March 1969) is a Spanish former footballer who played as a midfielder, currently manager of Cypriot club AEK Larnaca FC.

Playing career
Born in Valencia, Oltra spend the vast majority of his 14-year senior career in the lower leagues, representing Valencia CF Mestalla, SD Sueca, Levante UD, Yeclano Deportivo (two spells), Elche CF, Benidorm CF and Ontinyent CF. During an eight-season haul in Segunda División B, he amassed totals of 193 games and 21 goals.

The exception to this was in the 1991–92 campaign, when Oltra was part of CE Sabadell FC's squad in Segunda División. His debut as a professional took place on 8 September 1991, when he came as a second-half substitute in a 0–0 home draw against Real Avilés CF. He retired in 2001, aged 32.

Coaching career
Oltra started working as a manager immediately after retiring, with amateurs Catarroja CF. In 2002, he was appointed at third division club CD Castellón, leaving two years later by mutual consent and joining another team in that tier, Levante UD B.

Late into 2004–05, Oltra replaced fired Bernd Schuster at the helm of Levante's first team for the last four matches. He was not able to prevent La Liga relegation, and was himself relieved of his duties on 1 November 2005 due to poor results.

From 2006 to 2009, Oltra continued to work in division two, with Ciudad de Murcia and CD Tenerife. After collecting 24 wins from 42 games in the latter season, he led the latter team to the third place and the subsequent promotion.

In an emotional press conference, Oltra left the Canary Islands club on 20 May 2010 after suffering relegation. He continued to work in the top flight in the 2010–11 campaign, being one of three managers in charge of UD Almería as they went on to rank in 20th and last position.

Oltra won the 2012 second-tier championship with his next team, Deportivo de La Coruña. He was sacked on 30 December of that year, after a 2–0 away loss to RCD Espanyol left the Galicians last.

In the following seasons, always in the second division, Oltra coached RCD Mallorca, Recreativo de Huelva, Córdoba CF, Granada CF, Tenerife, Racing de Santander and CF Fuenlabrada. 

Oltra moved abroad for the first time in his career on 3 June 2022, after being named manager of Cypriot First Division club AEK Larnaca FC.

Managerial statistics

Honours

Manager
Castellón
Segunda División B: 2002–03

Deportivo
Segunda División: 2011–12

References

External links

1969 births
Living people
Spanish footballers
Footballers from Valencia (city)
Association football midfielders
Segunda División players
Segunda División B players
Tercera División players
Valencia CF Mestalla footballers
CE Sabadell FC footballers
Levante UD footballers
Yeclano Deportivo players
Elche CF players
Benidorm CF footballers
Ontinyent CF players
Spanish football managers
La Liga managers
Segunda División managers
Segunda División B managers
CD Castellón managers
Atlético Levante UD managers
Levante UD managers
Ciudad de Murcia managers
CD Tenerife managers
UD Almería managers
Deportivo de La Coruña managers
RCD Mallorca managers
Recreativo de Huelva managers
Córdoba CF managers
Granada CF managers
Racing de Santander managers
CF Fuenlabrada managers
Cypriot First Division managers
AEK Larnaca FC managers
Spanish expatriate football managers
Expatriate football managers in Cyprus
Spanish expatriate sportspeople in Cyprus